The 2021 German motorcycle Grand Prix (officially known as the Liqui Moly Motorrad Grand Prix Deutschland) was the eighth round of the 2021 Grand Prix motorcycle racing season. It was held at the Sachsenring in Hohenstein-Ernstthal on 20 June 2021.

Qualifying

MotoGP

Notes
  – Enea Bastianini was given a three-place grid penalty for irresponsible riding during Q1.

Race

MotoGP

Moto2

Moto3

Championship standings after the race
Below are the standings for the top five riders, constructors, and teams after the round.

MotoGP

Riders' Championship standings

Constructors' Championship standings

Teams' Championship standings

Moto2

Riders' Championship standings

Constructors' Championship standings

Teams' Championship standings

Moto3

Riders' Championship standings

Constructors' Championship standings

Teams' Championship standings

Notes

References

External links

German
Motorcycle Grand Prix
German motorcycle Grand Prix
Motorcycle Grand Prix